The 2012 Masters Grand Slam of Curling was held from November 14 to 18 at the Wayne Gretzky Sports Centre, the Brantford Golf & Curling Club, the Paris Curling Club, and the Brant Curling Club in Brantford and Paris, Ontario as part of the 2012–13 World Curling Tour. The majority of the women's Tier I round robin games and some of the men's Tier I round robin games was held at the Brantford Golf & Curling Club, while the remainder of the Tier I games and the playoffs round games were held at the Wayne Gretzky Sports Centre. The men's Tier II games and playoffs qualifiers was held at the Brant Curling Club, while the women's Tier II games and playoffs qualifiers was held at the Paris Curling Club and the Brantford Golf & Curling Club. It was held as the first Grand Slam event on the men's tour and the fourth on the women's tour.

The Masters is a continuation of the men's World Cup Grand Slam event which was previously known as the Masters. This was the first time that women participated in the event, but is considered a continuation of the women's Sun Life Classic.

Both the women's and men's events were split up into two tiers, with 18 teams in Tier I and 16 teams in Tier II. The Tier I teams were divided into 3 pools of 6 teams which played in a round robin, while the Tier II teams played off in a triple knockout event. 8 Tier II teams qualified for a playoff to determine which two teams would enter the playoffs along with six Tier I teams.

Rogers Sportsnet covered selected draws on television, while CBC Television aired the men's and women's finals. This marked the first time since 2006 that Sportsnet showed curling, as they have begun a new commitment to showing the sport, specifically Grand Slam events.

The total purse for the men's event was $100,000, while the purse for the women's event was $50,000.

Men

In the final of the men's event, Kevin Koe of Alberta defeated Jim Cotter of British Columbia with a score of 7–5.

Tier I

Round Robin Standings
Final Round Robin Standings

Tier II

Playoffs Qualifiers

Playoffs

Final
Sunday, November 18, 13:00

Women

In the final of the women's event, Rachel Homan of Ontario defeated Chelsea Carey of Manitoba with a score of 8–3.

Tier I

Round Robin Standings
Final Round Robin Standings

Tier II

Playoffs Qualifiers

Playoffs

Final
Sunday, November 18, 13:00

References

External links

Masters Grand Slam of Curling
Sport in Brantford
Curling in Ontario
Masters Grand Slam of Curling
Masters Grand Slam of Curling
Masters (curling)